Gustaf Gründgens (22 December 1899 – 7 October 1963), born Gustav Heinrich Arnold Gründgens, was one of Germany's most famous and influential actors of the 20th century, and artistic director of theatres in Berlin, Düsseldorf, and Hamburg. His career continued unimpeded through the years of the Nazi regime; the extent to which this can be considered as deliberate collaboration with the Nazis is hotly disputed.

His best known roles were that of Mephistopheles in Goethe's Faust in 1960, and as "Der Schränker" (The Safecracker) who is the chief judge of the kangaroo court presiding over Hans Beckert (Peter Lorre) in Fritz Lang's M.

Early life
Born in Düsseldorf, Gründgens attended the drama school of the Düsseldorfer Schauspielhaus after World War I and started his career at smaller theaters in Halberstadt, Kiel, and Berlin.

Career
In 1923, he joined the Kammerspiele in Hamburg, where he changed his first name to Gustaf and appeared as a director for the first time. In 1925, Gründgens wrote to Klaus Mann to propose a Hamburg production of Mann’s play Anja and Esther. Mann agreed, and Anja and Esther was performed in Hamburg with Gründgens directing and playing the role of Jakob. Mann played the role of Kaspar, while his sister Erika and his fiancée Pamela Wedekind played the lead roles of Anja and Esther. The play marked the beginning of Gründgens’ collaborations with the Mann siblings and Wedekind, as well as the beginning of his romantic relationship with Klaus Mann.

In 1928, he moved back to Berlin to join the renowned ensemble of the Deutsches Theater under the director Max Reinhardt. Apart from spoken theatre, Gründgens also worked with Otto Klemperer at the Kroll Opera, as a cabaret artist and as a screen actor, most notably in Fritz Lang's 1931 film M, which significantly increased his popularity. From 1932 he was a member of the Prussian State Theatre ensemble, in which he first stood out in the role of Mephistopheles.

Gründgens' career continued after the Nazi party came to power: in 1934 he became the Intendant, or artistic director, of the Prussian State Theatre and was later appointed a member of the Prussian state council by the Prussian Minister-President Hermann Göring. He also became a member of the Presidential Council of the Reichstheaterkammer (Theatre Chamber of the Reich), which was an institution of the Reichskulturkammer (Reich Chamber of Culture). In 1941, Gründgens starred (against his will and unpaid) in the propaganda film Ohm Krüger; he also played the title role in the fictional biographical film Friedemann Bach, which he also produced.

After Goebbels's total war speech on 18 February 1943, Gründgens volunteered for the Wehrmacht but was again recalled by Göring, who had his name added to the Gottbegnadeten list (Important Artist Exempt List).

Post-war life
Imprisoned by the Soviet NKVD for 9 months in 1945 – 1946, Gründgens was released thanks to the intercession of the Communist actor Ernst Busch, whom Gründgens himself had saved from execution by the Nazis in 1943. During the denazification process his statements helped to exonerate acting colleagues, including Göring’s widow, Emmy, and Veit Harlan, director of the film Jud Süß.

Gründgens returned to the Deutsches Theater, later became Intendant of the Düsseldorfer Schauspielhaus, and from 1955 directed the Deutsches Schauspielhaus in Hamburg. He again performed as Mephistopheles; the 1960 film Faust by Peter Gorski was made with the Deutsches Schauspielhaus ensemble.

Personal life
Gründgens became romantically involved with Klaus Mann while the two of them were performing in the Hamburg production of Mann’s play Anja and Esther. In 1926, while in a relationship with Klaus, Gründgens married Erika Mann, who was herself in a relationship with Klaus’s fiancé Pamela Wedekind. By 1927, Erika and Gründgens were separated. They officially divorced in 1929, around the time that Gründgens’s relationship with Klaus ended. Gründgens eventually became the basis of several characters in Klaus Mann’s fiction, including the character of Gregor Gregori in Treffpunkt im Unendlichen and the character of Hendrik Höfgen in the infamous novel Mephisto.

From 1936 to 1946, Gründgens was married to the famous German actress Marianne Hoppe. Despite these lavender marriages, Gründgens was widely known as homosexual. While other homosexuals were persecuted and sent to concentration camps during the Third Reich, Gründgens was tolerated by the Nazi elites because of his high reputation as an actor.

Death

On 7 October 1963, while traveling around the world, Gründgens died in Manila of an internal hemorrhage. It has never been ascertained whether or not he committed suicide by an overdose of sleeping pills. His last words, written on an envelope, were, "I believe that I took too many sleeping pills. I feel a little strange. Let me sleep long." He is buried at the Ohlsdorf Cemetery in Hamburg.

Mephisto judgment
Posthumously, Gründgens was involved in one of the more famous literary cases in 20th-century Germany as the subject of the novel Mephisto by his former lover Klaus Mann, who had died in 1949. The novel, a thinly veiled account of Gründgens's life, portrayed its main character Hendrik Höfgen as having shady connections with the Nazi regime. Gründgens's adopted son and heir Peter Gorski, who had directed Faust, successfully sued the publisher on his late father's behalf in 1966. The judgment was upheld by the Federal Court of Justice in 1968.

In the time-consuming lawsuit, the controversy over libel and the freedom of fiction from censorship was finally decided by the Federal Constitutional Court in 1971. It ruled that Gründgens's post-mortem personality rights prevailed and upheld the prohibition imposed on the publisher. However, the novel met with no further protests when it was published again in 1981 by Rowohlt.

In 1981, the novel was made into the film Mephisto, directed by István Szabó, with Klaus Maria Brandauer in the role of Hendrik Höfgen. The film was a huge commercial and critical success, and won the Academy Award for Best Foreign Language Film in 1981.

Filmography

Director 
 A City Upside Down (also actor, 1933)
 The Grand Duke's Finances (1934)
 Kapriolen (also actor, 1937)
 The False Step (1939)
 Zwei Welten (1939)
 Friedemann Bach (also actor, 1940)
 Faust (also actor, 1960, co-director Peter Gorski)

Actor 

 Never Trust a Woman (1930) .... Jean
 Hocuspocus (1930) .... Public Prosecutor Dr. Wilke
 Va Banque (1930) .... Private detective John James Brown
 Fire in the Opera House (1930) .... Otto van Lingen
 Danton (1930) .... Robespierre
 M (1931) .... Der Schränker (The Safecracker)
 The Theft of the Mona Lisa (1931) .... Unbekannter
 Louise, Queen of Prussia (1931) .... King Frederick William III
 Yorck (1931) .... Hardenberg
 The Countess of Monte Cristo (1932) .... "The Baron", con artist
 Teilnehmer antwortet nicht (1932) .... Nikolai
 Liebelei (1933) .... Baron von Eggersdorff
 A Love Story (1933) .... Baron von Eggersdorf
 Happy Days in Aranjuez (1933) .... Alexander
 The Tunnel (1933) .... Woolf
 The Tunnel (1933, French version) .... Woolf
 Schwarzer Jäger Johanna (1934) .... Dr. Frost
 So Ended a Great Love (1934) .... Metternich
 The Legacy of Pretoria (1934) .... Eugen Schliebach
  (1935) .... Fouché
 Joan of Arc (1935) .... King Charles VII
 Pygmalion (1935) .... Professor Higgins
 A Woman of No Importance (1936) .... Lord Illingworth
 Capers (1937) .... Jack Warren
 Dance on the Volcano (1938) .... Jean-Gaspard Deburau
 Ohm Krüger (1941) .... Joseph Chamberlain
 Friedemann Bach (1941) .... Wilhelm Friedemann Bach
 Das Glas Wasser (1960) .... Sir Henry St John
 Faust (1960) .... Mephistopheles (final film role)

Further reading 
 Ambesser, Gwendolyn von: Die Ratten betreten das sinkende Schiff: Das absurde Leben des Leo Reuss. Verlag Edition AV, Lich/Hessen 2005, .
 
 Berger, Renate: Tanz auf dem Vulkan. Gustaf Gründgens und Klaus Mann. Lambert Schneider, Darmstadt 2016, .
 
 Goertz, Heinrich: Gustaf Gründgens. Mit Selbstzeugnissen und Bilddokumenten. Rowohlt, Reinbek 1982, 7. Auflage 2006, .
 Carola Stern: Auf den Wassern des Lebens. Gustaf Gründgens und Marianne Hoppe. Kiepenheuer & Witsch, Köln 2005,  (Biografie).
 Carl Zuckmayer: Geheimreport. Dossiers über deutsche Künstler, Journalisten und Verleger im „Dritten Reich“. Hrsg. von Gunther Nickel und Johanna Schrön. Wallstein, Göttingen 2002, S.153 f.

See also 
Dohm–Mann family tree

References

External links 

 A biographical article http://www.wsws.org/articles/1999/dec1999/gust-d29.shtml
 Photographs of Gustaf Gründgens
 
 

1899 births
1963 deaths
20th-century German male actors
Actors from Düsseldorf
Bisexual male actors
Burials at the Ohlsdorf Cemetery
Drug-related deaths in the Philippines
Film directors from North Rhine-Westphalia
Film people from Düsseldorf
German male stage actors
Knights Commander of the Order of Merit of the Federal Republic of Germany
German LGBT actors
20th-century German LGBT people